Equal Scary People is the first album by the American singer-songwriter Sara Hickman, released in 1988 on Four Dots. It was rereleased in 1989 on Elektra Records.

Production
The album was co-produced by Carl Finch.

Critical reception
Trouser Press wrote that "with winning songs that are emotionally resonant and a little loopy, Equal Scary People ... is an album that easily stands out in a soundalike crowd." The Los Angeles Times wrote that Hickman "offers a hip but down-home, honest but irony-laden mix that fans of Michelle Shocked and k.d. lang should relate to just fine."

Track listing 
"Simply" (Hickman) – 3:03
"Last Night Was a Big Rain" (Hickman) – 3:19
"500x (The Train Song)" (Hickman) – 5:17
"Song for My Father" (Hickman) – 4:13
"Equal Scary People" (Hickman) – 4:38
"This Is a Man's World" (Brown) – 4:40
"Meant to Be" (Hickman) – 2:48
"Why Don't You" (Hickman) – 4:01
"I Wish I Were a Princess" (Creatore, Peretti, Weiss) – 3:07
"Under the Sycamore Tree" (Hickman) – 3:56

Personnel 
Sara Hickman – bass guitar, guitar, sound effects, chorus, harmony vocals, drum samples
Sandy Abernethy – chorus, harmony vocals
Josh Alan – acoustic guitar
Maurice Anderson – pedal steel
Dougie Bryan – guitar, chorus, harmony vocals
Carl Finch – organ, bass guitar, guitar, percussion, drums, vocals, harmony vocals, bass samples, hi hat
Bubba Hernandez – bass guitar
Mitch Marine – drums
Brad McLemore – classical guitar
Darryl Melugin – bass guitar
Scott Murphy
Reggie Rueffer – violin
Terry Slemmons – electric guitar, harmony vocals
Kenny Smith – drums, tambourine, chorus

Production 
Producer: Sara Hickman, Carl Finch
Executive producer: Sara Hickman
Engineer: Terry Slemmons
Art direction: Sara Hickman
Cover art concept: Sara Hickman

References 

Sara Hickman albums
1988 debut albums